Frammenti is an Italian TV series and ARG (Alternative Reality Game) produced in 2009.

See also
List of Italian television series

Italian television series
2009 Italian television series debuts